Trithemis selika, also known by its common name crimson dropwing, is a species from the genus Trithemis.   The species name comes from the heroine of the opera L'Africaine.

References

selika
Insects of Madagascar
Insects described in 1869